Ceratitidae is an extinct family of ammonite cephalopods.

Fossils of Ceratitidae are found in the Triassic marine strata throughout the world, including Asia, Europe, the Middle East, North America, and Oceania.

Selected genera
Subfamily Ceratitinae Mojsisovics 1879
 Acanthoceratites Schrammen 1928
 Alloceratites Spath 1934
 Ceratites de Haan 1825
 Eogymnotoceras Bucher 1988
 Latemarites Brack and Rieber 1993
Subfamily Nevaditinae Tozer 1994
 Alkaites Balini et al. 2006
 Chieseiceras Brack and Rieber 1986
 Detoniceras Manfrin and Mietto 1991
 Nevadites Smith 1914
 Paranevadites Tozer 1994
 Xenoprotrachyc 
Subfamily Paraceratitinae Silberling 1962
 Brackites Monnet and Bucher 2005
 Ceccaceras Monnet and Bucher 2005
 Eutomoceras Hyatt 1877
 Halilucites Diener 1905
 Jenksites Monnet and Bucher 2005
 Kellnerites Arthaber 1912
 Marcouxites Monnet and Bucher 2005
 Paraceratites Hyatt 1900
 Parakellnerites Rieber 1973
 Repossia Rieber 1973
 Rieberites Monnet and Bucher 2005
 Rieppelites Monnet and Bucher 2005
 Ronconites Balini 1992
 Rossiceras Fantini Sestini 1994
 Semiornites Arthaber 1912
 Silberlingitoides Monnet and Bucher 2006
 Stoppaniceras Rieber 1973

References
 The Paleobiology Database

 
Ceratitida families
Triassic ammonites
Triassic first appearances
Triassic extinctions